is a 2001 Japanese youth drama film, written and directed by Toshiaki Toyoda and based on Taiyō Matsumoto's manga of same title. It tells a tale of apathetic school students at a run-down Tokyo high school for boys. It was released on September 10, 2001.

The film title can be understood as "inexperienced years" or teenage years, but it also can be understood as "fresh start". According to manga artist Taiyō Matsumoto, the title is intended as a play on irony.

Plot
At Asashi High, a run-down high school for boys, Kujo, Aoki, Yukio, Yoshimura, and Ota are a gang of school friends lost in apathy and dissatisfaction. They are aware their future offers limited options. Even most teachers have already written them off as a lost cause.

Kujo's gang is part of the school's illegal society, which is controlled through a rooftop game as a test of courage: the Clapping Game. Whoever wins the game gets to be the society's leader, and rules all gangs throughout Asahi High. No teacher can stand up to this society.

After a round of the Clapping Game, Kujo wins the leadership role, which excites his best friend Aoki, who wants Kujo to dominate the school through the use of casual violence. However, Kujo passively resists doing this.

Aoki eventually realizes his best friend only took part in the Clapping Game to pass the time, and that Kujo never wanted to be the school's leader. Devastated, he challenges Kujo for his leadership, and loses.

As Aoki becomes disillusioned, alienated and hostile toward Kujo, friends around them slowly fall apart, bringing their school to a series of mini violent climaxes.

Cast
 Ryuhei Matsuda as Kujo 
 Hirofumi Arai as Aoki 
 Sousuke Takaoka as Yukio 
 Yusuke Oshiba as Kimura 
 Yuta Yamazaki as Ota 
 Shugo Oshinari as Yoshimura 
 Kiyohiko Shibukawa as Kee 
 Onimaru as Suzuki 
 Eita as Obake/Ghost 
 Rei Yamanaka as Leo 
 Mame Yamada as Hanada-sensei
 Erena as High School girl
 Genta Dairaku as Career counselor 
 Kyôko Koizumi as Kiosk woman 
 Takashi Tsukamoto as Freshman in Baseball Club

Soundtrack
The Blue Spring original soundtrack rose to #24 on Oricon Albums Chart Top 30 shortly after the film release and Drop, a track from the soundtrack, rose to #13 on Oricon Singles Chart Top 30 in July 2002.

DVD
Released under Artsmagic in 2004, the DVD features extras including two interviews with Toyoda, biographies and filmographies of the main actors and a feature-length commentary by Tom Mes, who edits Midnight Eye, an online English-language magazine of Japanese cinema.

Reception
On Midnight Eye, Tom Mes said the film was "magnificent but much overlooked".

References

External links 
 

2001 films
Live-action films based on manga
2000s thriller films
Japanese thriller films
Films directed by Toshiaki Toyoda
2000s Japanese-language films
2000s Japanese films